Bostan Junction Railway Station (Balochi:بوستان جنکشن ریلوے اسٹیشن) is located in Bostan, Pishin District of Balochistan province in Pakistan. It serves as the junction between the Rohri-Chaman Railway and Zhob Valley Railway.

See also
 List of railway stations in Pakistan
 Pakistan Railways

References

External links

Railway stations in Pishin District
Railway stations on Rohri–Chaman Railway Line
Railway stations on Zhob Valley Railway Line